''The Richard M. Ross Museum of Art is located on Sandusky Street on the campus of Ohio Wesleyan University in Delaware, Ohio, United States.

Architectural history
The building housing the museum was designed in a Richardsonian style in the early twentieth century. It was acquired by the University in 1969, prior to which it served as a post office.  For several decades it housed the Fine Arts Department, and in 2002 the building was renovated to house the new museum.

External links
 Richard M. Ross Museum of Art website

Ohio Wesleyan University buildings
University museums in Ohio
Art museums and galleries in Ohio
Museums in Delaware County, Ohio
Art museums established in 2002
2002 establishments in Ohio